Haversin Castle is a 17th-century château in the hamlet of Haversin, part of the village of Serinchamps in the municipality of Ciney, province of Namur, Wallonia, Belgium.

See also
List of castles in Belgium
 List of protected heritage sites in Ciney

External links
 
Harvesin village website

Castles in Belgium
Castles in Namur (province)
Ciney